"Lost Angels" is the thirty-third single by Japanese recording artist Gackt, released on June 24, 2009. This single is the third of four singles of the countdown to Gackt's 10th anniversary as solo artist. This single has been titled "The 3rd Heaven". Each of the countdown singles were released within a week of each other. The title track was used as ending theme song of the Nippon TV's program  between June 29 and October 2, 2009.

CD

Charts

References

2009 singles
Gackt songs
Songs written by Gackt
2009 songs